Funhouse is the second and penultimate album by American hip hop duo Kid 'n Play. It was released on March 13, 1990, through Select Records. Recording sessions took place at Bayside Sound Recording Studio and at Soundcheck Studio in New York. Production was handled by Hurby "Luv Bug" Azor and the Invincibles. It features the lone guest appearance from Salt-N-Pepa.

The album reached number 58 on the Billboard 200 and number 11 on the Top R&B/Hip-Hop Albums. It was certified Gold by the Recording Industry Association of America on June 12, 1992. The album spawned two singles, "Funhouse" from House Party (Original Motion Picture Soundtrack), which peaked at No. 27 on the Hot R&B/Hip-Hop Songs and topped the Hot Rap Songs chart, and "Back to Basics", which peaked at No. 69 on the Hot R&B/Hip-Hop Songs and No. 16 on the Hot Rap Songs. The song "Toe to Toe" was released as a promotional single.

Track listing

Personnel
Christopher Reid – main artist
Christopher Martin – main artist, co-producer (track 10)
Salt-N-Pepa – featured artists (track 6)
Hurby "Luv Bug"/"Fingerprints" Azor – backing vocals, producer
Robin Feinberg – backing vocals
Glenn D. Gibson – guitar
Stanley Aaron Brown – keyboards, co-producer (tracks: 3, 6, 11)
Eric "Quicksilver" Johnson – co-producer (tracks: 1, 9)
The Wizard M.E. – co-producer (tracks: 2, 8)
"The Grand Composer" Dre – co-producer (track 2)
Dana Mozie – co-producer (tracks: 4, 7, 10)
Steve Azor – co-producer (track 5)
Andre DeBourg – engineering
Amy Bennick – art direction

Charts

Certifications

References

External links

1990 albums
Kid 'n Play albums
Select Records albums
Albums produced by Hurby Azor